The Meshushim Stream (Nahal Meshushim, "Hexagons Stream", Arabic: Wadi el-Hawa/Fakhura/Zaki) is part of the Yehudiya Forest Nature Reserve in the Golan Heights. 35 km long, it starts from the foothills of Mount Avital and discharges via the Bethsaida Valley into the Sea of Galilee.

The stream owes its name to the hexagonal basalt columns visible on the banks in the central part of its course. A prominent example of this kind of geology and a tourist attraction is the Hexagon Pool.

It is the only river in the Golan not impounded in reservoirs.

References

Sea of Galilee
Landforms of the  Golan Heights
Tourist attractions in Israel
Tourist attractions in Syria